The Electoral district of County of Cumberland was an electorate of the New South Wales Legislative Council at a time when some of its members were elected and the balance were appointed by the Governor.

It was created by the 1843 Electoral Districts Act and returned two members. In 1856 the unicameral Legislative Council was abolished and replaced with an elected Legislative Assembly and an appointed Legislative Council. The district was represented by the Legislative Assembly electorates of Cumberland (South Riding) and Cumberland (North Riding).

Members

Election results

1843

1848

1849
Nelson Lawson died in February 1849.

1850
Charles Cowper resigned in February 1850.

1851

See also
Members of the New South Wales Legislative Council, 1843–1851 and 1851-1856

External links
Hansard NSW Legislative Council

References

Former electoral districts of New South Wales Legislative Council
1843 establishments in Australia
1856 disestablishments in Australia